Miki Kozuka (born 13 January 1996) is a Japanese field hockey player for the Japanese national team.

She participated at the 2018 Women's Hockey World Cup.

References

External links
 

1996 births
Living people
Japanese female field hockey players
Field hockey players at the 2020 Summer Olympics
Olympic field hockey players of Japan
21st-century Japanese women